Governor Hamilton may refer to:

Andrew Hamilton (New Jersey governor) (died 1703), Colonial Governor of East and West New Jersey from 1692 to 1697 and from 1699 to 1703
Andrew Jackson Hamilton (1815–1875), 11th Governor of Texas
Lord Archibald Hamilton (1673–1754), Governor of Jamaica from 1711 to 1716
George Hamilton, 1st Earl of Orkney (1666–1737), Colonial Governor of Virginia from 1698 to 1737 and Governor of Edinburgh Castle from 1714 to 1737
Henry Hamilton (governor) (1734–1796),  Governor of Bermuda from 1785 to 1794 and Governor of Dominica from 1794 to 1796
James Hamilton (Pennsylvania) (1710–1783), Deputy Governor of the Province of Pennsylvania from 1748 to 1754 and from 1759 to 1763
James Hamilton Jr. (1786–1857), 53rd Governor of South Carolina
John Hamilton (New Jersey politician) (1680s–1747), Acting Governor of the Province of New Jersey from 1736 to 1738 and from 1746 to 1747
John Marshall Hamilton (1847–1905), 18th Governor of Illinois
Otho Hamilton (died 1770), Governor of Placentia from 1744 to 1764
Paul Hamilton (politician) (1762–1816), 42nd Governor of South Carolina (including colonial governors; 15th for the state)
William Gerard Hamilton (1729–1796), English statesman and Irish politician
William Thomas Hamilton (1820–1888), 38th Governor of Maryland